Julia Carolyn Margaret Morris (born 20 April 1968) is an Australian comedian, television presenter and actress who has worked extensively in Australian television and radio, touring the country with her solo comedy shows. She relocated to the United Kingdom in 2000, appearing on British television, then returned to Australia in 2007. She lived on the Central Coast for her childhood.

Personal life 
Morris was educated at St Patrick's Catholic Primary School, St Joseph's Catholic College, East Gosford, Santa Sabina College, Strathfield, and the Ensemble Theatre School. She later attended acting school for two years in Los Angeles.

Morris married British comedian Dan Thomas in Las Vegas on 31 December 2005. They divorced in 2022.

Career

Television 

Morris's first television appearance was in 1985, aged 17, as a contestant on the talent show New Faces. She performed "Holding Out for a Hero", a Jim Steinman song made famous by Bonnie Tyler, and tied for first place.

After several years in variety and stand-up, Morris's her big break came when she joined the ensemble cast of the hit Australian sketch comedy series Full Frontal in 1995. This led to hosting roles on Great Aussie Bloopers and "The Morris Report" on the live variety series In Melbourne Tonight, as well as regular appearances on The Midday Show, Good Morning Australia, Beauty and the Beast and Who Dares Wins as well as the action series Gladiators.

Morris relocated to the United Kingdom in 2000. As well as stand-up, she made appearances on the TV quiz QI, an episode of the sitcom Not Going Out playing a successful beautician, and in the sixth episode of season three of Kathy Griffin's My Life on the D-List, offering advice on the British audiences. Morris also had a stint presenting the BBC's Liquid News show in 2002.

Since her return to Australia in 2007, Morris has made appearances on Thank God You're Here, Good News Week, Spicks and Specks, Rove Live, The Singing Office, It Takes Two, Sleuth 101, Studio 10, The Project, The Living Room, Have You Been Paying Attention? and Hughesy, We Have a Problem. She won the third season of the reality singing series It Takes Two, in which she was partnered with opera singer David Hobson. Her winnings were donated to the Emily Tapp Foundation, a charity dedicated to melanoma awareness and prevention. She has also appeared in a series of commercials for All-Bran cereal, which also featured fellow actress and comedian Helen Dallimore.

Morris was the winning contestant on the 2011 series of The Celebrity Apprentice Australia, beating teammate Jason Coleman, model Jesinta Campbell and AFL footballer Shane Crawford.

In 2012, Morris has starred as Gemma Crabb in the Nine Network's Melbourne-made drama series House Husbands. The show commenced a second season on 8 April 2013.

In April 2013, Morris was announced as the new host of television talent show Australia's Got Talent, which has switched from the Seven Network to the Nine Network.

On 1 February 2015, Morris began co-hosting the Australian version of I'm a Celebrity...Get Me Out of Here! with Chris Brown on Network 10.

In 2018, Morris hosted an updated version of dating show Blind Date on Network 10.

On 24 February 2019, she also began co-hosting Chris & Julia's Sunday Night Takeaway with Chris Brown on Network 10.

At the 61st TV Week Logie Awards in 2019, Morris was nominated for the Gold Logie for the two aforementioned shows as well as I'm A Celebrity...Get Me Out Of Here!

In 2020, Morris appeared as "Kitten" on the second season of The Masked Singer Australia and was eliminated in the semi-final, placing 5th overall.

Live performance 
Morris tours international comedy festivals, appearing at the Edinburgh Festival Fringe, South Africa's Vodacom Funny Festival, Montreal's Just For Laughs and the Melbourne International Comedy Festival. She won a Herald Angel Award at the 2001 Edinburgh Festival Fringe and Time Out magazine's Comedy Performer of the Year Award in 2004. She is a former manager of Sydney's Comedy Store venue.

In 1999 Morris toured in the critically acclaimed Australian production of the Off-Broadway musical I Love You, You're Perfect, Now Change.

Television 

As herself

References

External links 
 Official website
 
 BBC News article discussing the Liquid News presenter lineup, August 2002
 Review at chortle.co.uk
 Review of 2003 Edinburgh Festival show Will You Kids Get Out Of That Pool Please!
 Review of 2004 Brighton Comedy Festival show Lady Julia Morris Live
 Julia Morris biography – It Takes Two website

Australian women comedians
Australian expatriates in England
Living people
1968 births
Australian people of Welsh descent
The Apprentice Australia candidates
The Apprentice (franchise) winners
Australia's Got Talent
Helpmann Award winners
Comedians from Sydney